was a town located in Sakata District, Shiga Prefecture, Japan.

On October 1, 2005, Ōmi was merged into the expanded city of Maibara.

As of 2003, the town had an estimated population of 9,663 and a density of 535.64 persons per km2. The total area was 18.04 km2.

Dissolved municipalities of Shiga Prefecture